Agnes Ramsey (died 1399), was an English businesswoman. She was the daughter of architect and mason William Ramsey, and married mason Robert Hubard. She was likely trained in the craft by her father.

Upon the death of her father in 1349, Ramsey inherited his business. This included a London-based workshop producing tombs. Ramsey assumed her father's debt and engaged in property transactions; several of her business transactions are preserved in documents. She was a very successful mason-architect, and belonged to the elite of the profession in late 14th-century London. In the 1350s, she was contracted by Queen Isabella for the construction of the queen's tomb at the London Greyfriars, at a cost of over £100. Ramsey is thought to be responsible for overseeing the placement of Edward II's heart in Isabella's tomb.

References

1399 deaths
14th-century English businesspeople
English Freemasons
Medieval businesswomen